Feuchtwanger is a German Jewish surname, indicating a family origin from the city of Feuchtwangen. Notable people with the surname include:

Edgar Feuchtwanger (born 1924), German-British historian
Lewis Feuchtwanger (1805–1876), Jewish German-American chemist
Lion Feuchtwanger (1884–1958), Jewish German writer
Ludwig Feuchtwanger (1885–1947), German lawyer, lecturer and writer
Peter Feuchtwanger (1930–2016), German classical pianist/teacher, based in London

See also
12350 Feuchtwanger, main-belt asteroid, named after Lion Feuchtwanger
Feuchtwanger Cent, 19th century United States token (coin), after Lewis Feuchtwanger

German-language surnames
Jewish surnames
Jewish-German families
Yiddish-language surnames